NA-109 Jhang-II is a constituency for the National Assembly of Pakistan. It is based on the old NA-89 with the main difference being the transfer of the town of Bagh to the new NA-116 and the inclusion of Jhang No. 2 from the old NA-87.

Members of Parliament

2018-2022: NA-115 Jhang-II

Election 2002 

General elections were held on 10 Oct 2002. Maulana Muhammad Azam Tariq an Independent candidate won by 41,425 votes.

Election 2008 

General elections were held on 18 Feb 2008. Sheikh Waqas Akram of PML-Q won by 51,976 votes.

Election 2013 

General elections were held on 11 May 2013. Sheikh Muhammad Akram of PML-N won by 74,324 votes and became the  member of National Assembly. However an Election tribunal on 4 April 2014 disqualified him on the charges of bogus voting and bank loan default, and named the runner up Maulana Mohammad Ahmed Ludhianvi of Ahle Sunnat Wal Jamaat as the winner.

Election 2018 
General elections were held on 25 July 2018.

See also
NA-108 Jhang-I
NA-110 Jhang-III

References

External links
 Election result's official website

NA-089